The Laramie Project is a 2002 drama film written and directed by Moisés Kaufman and starring Nestor Carbonell, Christina Ricci, Dylan Baker, Terry Kinney, and Lou Ann Wright. Based on the play of the same name, the film tells the story of the aftermath of the 1998 murder of Matthew Shepard in Laramie, Wyoming. It premiered at the 2002 Sundance Film Festival and was first broadcast on HBO in March 2002.

Cast

Reception
Matt Roush of TV Guide praised the film for "elevating Shepard's murder to a higher crossroads of journalism and theatricality." Roush singled out the film's cast, and its "original" and "unique investigation", likening its focus on Nestor Carbonell's Kaufman to Truman Capote making himself the star of In Cold Blood. Roush also noted the film's emotional range and its examination of homophobia, saying that it could "enlighten" viewers.

Awards

See also
 Anatomy of a Hate Crime
 The Matthew Shepard Story

Notes

External links

 
 
 

Works about Matthew Shepard
2002 films
2002 crime drama films
2002 LGBT-related films
American crime drama films
American films based on actual events
American films based on plays
American LGBT-related television films
Crime films based on actual events
Drama films based on actual events
Films set in the 1990s
Films set in Wyoming
Gay-related films
HBO Films films
Homophobia in fiction
LGBT-related drama films
LGBT-related films based on actual events
Television shows based on plays
Films about violence against LGBT people
2000s English-language films
2000s American films